Belah is a suburb of Carlisle, Cumbria, England.

Belah can also refer to:
Bela (biblical figure) or Belah, a minor biblical figure
Casuarina cristata, Australian tree known as belah
Belah, New South Wales, a parish in Flinders County, New South Wales, Australia
Belah, Queensland, a community in the Darling Downs area of Queensland, Australia 
Belah, Louisiana, a community near Jena, Louisiana, United States
River Belah, Cumbria, England
Belah Viaduct, a former railway viaduct over the above river

See also
Bela (disambiguation)